Nicolás Perea (born August 6, 1992) is a Colombian-born American footballer who last played as a midfielder for Indy Eleven in USL Championship. Perea also plays beach soccer and represents the United States at the international level.

Career

College
Perea played four years of college soccer at Syracuse University between 2011 and 2014.

While at college, Perea played with USL PDL sides Ocean City Nor'easters  K-W United FC.

Professional 
Perea signed his first professional contract with second-tier NASL side, Jacksonville Armada FC on February 10, 2015.

Perea joined United Soccer League side Rio Grande Valley FC in September 2017.

After playing the 2019 USL League Two season with Des Moines Menace, Perea signed with USL Championship club Indy Eleven on August 27, 2019.

International 
Perea participated in a beach soccer camp training in Ft. Lauderdale where he was scouted by the United States national beach soccer team coach Francis Farberoff. In January 2019, Perea started to get call-ups for the national beach soccer team and on May 16, 2021, he was called up to represent the US at the 2021 CONCACAF Beach Soccer Championship. Perea was part of the team that qualified the United States to their second FIFA Beach Soccer World Cup in a row.

References

External links 
 Jacksonville Profile
 

1992 births
Living people
Colombian footballers
Colombian expatriate footballers
Syracuse Orange men's soccer players
Ocean City Nor'easters players
K-W United FC players
Jacksonville Armada FC players
Rio Grande Valley FC Toros players
Des Moines Menace players
Association football midfielders
Expatriate soccer players in the United States
USL League Two players
North American Soccer League players
Indy Eleven players
USL Championship players
Beach soccer players
People from Bucaramanga
Sportspeople from Santander Department